Harun Bazar (also Romanized as Hārūn Bāzār; also known as Hārūbāzār) is a village in Polan Rural District, Polan District, Chabahar County, Sistan and Baluchestan Province, Iran. At the 2006 census, its population was 35, in 6 families.

References 

Populated places in Chabahar County